HCMS may refer to:

 Haryana Civil Medical Services, the government service in the department of health in Haryana, India
 Heron Creek Middle School, a middle school in North Port, Florida, United States
 Iskushuban Airport (ICAO airport code HCMS) in Iskushuban, Somalia